Mystery Mountain is a 1934 American Western serial film directed by Otto Brower and B. Reeves Eason and starring Ken Maynard, Verna Hillie, Syd Saylor, Edward Earle, and Hooper Atchley. Distributed by Mascot Pictures, Mystery Mountain features the second ever film appearance by Gene Autry.

Plot
Ken Williams (Ken Maynard) is determined to discover the identity of a mysterious killer who preys upon railroads and transportation companies like the ones owned by Jane Corwin (Verna Hillie).  Her railroad worker father (Lafe McKee) was the first victim of the murderous fiend known as the Rattler, who is especially difficult to catch because he makes himself appear as other people with a collection of masks, or he effects a strange disguise with eyeglasses, a fake nose, and a crepe-hair mustache. The Rattler — also known as "the Menace of the Mountain" — attempts to control the mountain and its hidden gold from his secret cave filled with strange electronic gadgets.

Cast

 Ken Maynard as Ken Williams, railroad detective
 Verna Hillie as Jane Corwin
 Syd Saylor as Breezy Baker
 Edward Earle as Frank Blayden
 Hooper Atchley as Dr Edwards
 Edward Hearn as Lake
 Al Bridge as Tom Henderson
 Bob Kortman as Hank, one of The Rattler's henchmen
 Lew Meehan as Red, one of The Rattler's henchmen
 George Chesebro as Anderson, one of The Rattler's henchmen
 Tom London as Morgan, one of The Rattler's henchmen
 Lynton Brent as Mathews, the telegrapher
 Tarzan as Tarzan (Ken Williams' horse)
 Gene Autry as Thomas, Lake Teamster (chapters 6,7,8,12) (uncredited)

Production

Filming and budget
Mystery Mountain was filmed in the fall of 1934. The film had an operating budget of $65,000 (equal to $ today), and a negative cost of $80,000.

Filming locations
 Bronson Canyon, Griffith Park, Los Angeles, California, USA
 Iverson Movie Ranch, Santa Susana Pass, Chatsworth, California, USA

Stuntwork
 Yakima Canutt
 Cliff Lyons (Ken Maynard's stunt double)

According to the book The Great Movie Serials: Their Sound and Fury, Ken Maynard was doubled by Cliff Lyons in some scenes but performed many of his own stunts, especially riding, in others. However, the later book In the Nick of Time states that Ken Maynard was doubled by his brother Kermit Maynard.  The physical similarities between the two makes it difficult to spot the difference on screen between actor and stuntman. Maynard's horse, Tarzan, had three doubles, one of which was blind.

Future serial director William Witney, working as an assistant director, performed one stunt during this serial when the stuntman failed to show up to the location shoot.  He rode a horse at speed across a bridge over a ravine with a moving train behind him.

Special effects
Special effects were provided by J. Laurence Wickland.

Chapter titles
 The Rattler
 The Man Nobody Knows
 The Eye That Never Sleeps
 The Human Target
 Phantom Outlaws
 The Perfect Crime
 Tarzan the Cunning
 The Enemy's Stronghold
 The Fatal Warning
 The Secret of the Mountain
 Behind the Mask
 The Judgment of Tarzan

See also
 List of film serials by year
 List of film serials by studio

References
Citations

Bibliography

External links
 
 
 

1934 films
1930s English-language films
1934 Western (genre) films
American black-and-white films
Mascot Pictures film serials
Films directed by B. Reeves Eason
Films directed by Otto Brower
Films produced by Nat Levine
American Western (genre) films
1930s American films